Huzová (1880–1910 Německá Huzová, 1921–1951 Německá Húzová) is a municipality and village in Olomouc District in the Olomouc Region of the Czech Republic. It has about 600 inhabitants.

Administrative parts
Villages of Arnoltice and Veveří are administrative parts of Huzová.

References

Villages in Olomouc District